Maradona Rebello (born 31 May 1986) is an Indian actor and model who works in the Bollywood film industry. Rebello's first name was kept by his father after being inspired by the footballer Diego Maradona. After doing theatre in school and a brief career in acting, Rebello's film career began with the 2010 film Pankh. Rebello is also a well known model, having worked for brands like Ford, Close Up, Axe, Intel, 7 Up, L'Oreal and Volkswagen.

Life and career

1986–2008: Early life
Rebello's modelling career took off by chance when he was spotted by a model coordinator outside a cinema hall and was signed up for assignments. Rebello also auditioned for the 2009 film Slumdog Millionaire and met director Danny Boyle, but was rejected because Boyle thought that his looks were not Indian enough to meet his characterization.

2009–present: Bollywood debut with Pankh 

While doing BMM (Bachelors in Mass Media) from St. Xavier's College, Mumbai, Rebello got an offer from Sudipto Chattopadhay to audition for the upcoming film Pankh. He went for the audition and gave his shots, but was apprehensive to join the Bollywood film industry, because he believed in a different image of Bollywood—one with romance and drama.

Rebello played the character of a 20-year-old boy named Jerry, who used to act in girl roles when he was young.

He also played the role of Sam in Dunno Y Na Jaane Kyun

Influences
His primary influences have been actors Shahrukh Khan and Amitabh Bachchan. His other inspirations are Mexican actor Gael García Bernal and Hollywood actors Leonardo DiCaprio and Jude Law.

References

External links

Maradon Rebello on Instagram

1986 births
Male actors in Hindi cinema
Indian male film actors
Indian male models
Living people
Male actors from Mumbai
21st-century Indian male actors